Oktyabrsky is a rural locality (a settlement) and the administrative center of Oktyabrskoye Rural Settlement, Vyaznikovsky District, Vladimir Oblast, Russia. The population was 2,017 as of 2010. There are 17 streets.

Geography 
Oktyabrsky is located 11 km west of Vyazniki (the district's administrative centre) by road. Senkovo is the nearest rural locality.

References 

Rural localities in Vyaznikovsky District
Vyaznikovsky Uyezd